Muddy River may refer to:

Streams
Muddy River (Birch Creek tributary), a tributary of Birch Creek in Alaska
Muddy River (Connecticut), a tributary of the Quinnipiac River
Muddy River (Massachusetts), a series of brooks and ponds that runs through sections of Boston's Emerald Necklace
Muddy River (Merrymeeting Bay), a river in Maine
Muddy River (Nevada), a river in Nevada
Muddy River (Sebago Lake), a river in Maine
Muddy River (Washington), a river in the state of Washington

Other
Muddy River (film), a 1981 Japanese film

See also 
 Muddy Creek (disambiguation)
 Muddy (disambiguation)